George B. Binlein (1879 – January 4, 1954) was an American football player and coach. He served as the head football coach at St. Mary's College—now known as the University of Dayton—in 1909, compiling a record of 4–3. After graduating from Dayton, Binlein served as an instructor at Duquesne University in Pittsburgh, Pennsylvania.

Head coaching record

References

External links
 

1879 births
1954 deaths
Dayton Flyers football coaches
Dayton Flyers football players
Sportspeople from Pittsburgh
Players of American football from Pittsburgh